Mystery Lake is a local government district (LGD) in northern Manitoba. It surrounds the city of Thompson, although most of its territory lies to the southwest and south of the city. It is named after Mystery Lake, a lake located in the northeast section of the LGD, northeast of Thompson.

Communities
 Moak Lake

Demographics 
In the 2021 Census of Population conducted by Statistics Canada, Mystery Lake had a population of 0 living in 0 of its 0 total private dwellings, no change from its 2016 population of 0.

References

External links 
Map of Mystery Lake at Statcan

Local government districts in Manitoba
Populated places in Northern Region, Manitoba